General elections were held in the Cayman Islands on 20 May 2009 alongside a referendum on a draft constitution. The opposition United Democratic Party defeated the incumbent People's Progressive Movement.

Results

References

2009 elections in the Caribbean
Elections in the Cayman Islands
2009 in the Cayman Islands
2009 elections in British Overseas Territories
May 2009 events in North America
Election and referendum articles with incomplete results